The 2012–13 CSKA season was the 21st successive season that the club will play in the Russian Premier League, the highest tier of association football in Russia.

Squad

Transfers

In

Out

Loans out

Released

Friendlies

Copa del Sol

Competitions

Premier League

Results by round

Matches

Table

Russian Cup

Europa League

Qualifying phase

Squad statistics

Appearances and goals

|-
|colspan="14"|Players away from the club on loan:

|-
|colspan="14"|Players who appeared for CSKA no longer at the club:

|}

Goal scorers

Disciplinary record

References

PFC CSKA Moscow seasons
CSKA Moscow
Russian football championship-winning seasons